Rocotopunta (Quechua rukutu, a plant (Capsicum pubescens) and Spanish punta, a peak or ridge) is a mountain in the Cordillera Blanca in the Andes of Peru, about  high. It is located in the Ancash Region, Recuay Province, Ticapampa District, northeast of Lake Querococha. Rocotopunta lies between Yanamarey Creek to the north and Conde Creek to  the south.

References 

Mountains of Peru
Mountains of Ancash Region